Mehić is South-Slavic patronymic surname derived from the given name Meho (variation of Mehmetd). Notable people include:

 Damir Mehić (born 1987), Bosnian-born Swedish footballer
 David Mehić (born 1997), Serbian volleyball player
 Sead Mehić (born 1975), Bosnian footballer

See also
 Mehmedović

Bosnian surnames
Serbian surnames
Patronymic surnames